The following is a list of episodes for the Network Ten comedy series, The Wedge.

Season one

We're Moving

Lucky

Thanks For Coming

That's Valid

Season two

¹This episode featured a cameo appearance from past cast members, Julia Zemiro and Marney McQueen.

Lists of Australian comedy television series episodes